Alfredo da Rocha Viana Filho, known as Pixinguinha (April 23, 1897February 17, 1973) was a Brazilian composer, arranger, flautist and saxophonist born in Rio de Janeiro. Pixinguinha composed popular music, particularly within the genre of music known as choro. 

By integrating the music of the older choro composers of the 19th century with contemporary jazz-like harmonies, Afro-Brazilian rhythms, and sophisticated arrangements, he introduced choro to a new audience and helped to popularize it as a uniquely Brazilian genre. He was also one of the first Brazilian musicians and composers to take advantage of radio broadcasting technology and studio recording. Pixinguinha composed dozens of choros, including some of the best-known works in the genre such as "Carinhoso", "Glória", "Lamento" and "Um a Zero".

Early life and early career
Pixinguinha was the son of musician Alfredo da Rocha Viana, a flautist who maintained a large collection of older choro scores and hosted frequent musical gatherings at his home. Pixinguinha learned to play the flute at home but soon became a pupil of Irineu de Almeida, composing his first piece at age 14 and making his first recording at age 16. In 1912 he began to perform in cabarets and revues in the Rio de Janeiro neighborhood of Lapa. He then became the flutist in the house orchestra at the Cine Rio Branco movie theater (silent films at that time were often accompanied by live music). In 1914 he joined with his friends João Pernambuco and Donga to form the group Caxangá, a group which gained considerable attention before it disbanded in 1919.

Os Oito Batutas

Five years later in 1919, Pixinguinha, along with his brother China, Donga, João Pernambuco, and other prominent musicians, formed the musical group . The instrumental lineup was at first fairly traditional, dominated by a rhythm section of plucked strings: Pixinguinha on flute, plus guitars, cavaquinho, banjo cavaquinho, and hand percussion. Performing in the lobby of the Cine Palais movie theater, Os Oito Batutas soon become a more popular attraction than the films themselves. Their repertoire was diverse, encompassing folk music from northeast Brasil, sambas, maxixes, waltzes, polkas, and "brazilian tangos" (the term choro was not yet established as a genre). The group appealed especially to the nationalistic desires of upper-class Brazilians who yearned for a homegrown, uniquely Brazilian musical tradition free from foreign influences. Os Oito Batutas became a sensation across Brasil, though they were not without controversy. Certain members of the white Rio elite were not happy with black men performing in venues for example.

Os Oito Batutas, and Pixinguinha specifically, were the target of attacks reflecting anxieties about race and the influence of Europe and the United States on Brazilian music. The group, which consisted of both white and black musicians, performed mainly in upper-class venues where black musicians had previously been prohibited. Moreover, they were criticized ferociously by those who felt that Brazilian musical culture should reflect primarily its European roots and that a black musical ambassador was an embarrassment. Finally, Pixinguinha's compositional style and his incorporation of trumpets and saxophones was criticized as being corrupted by American jazz, which was then becoming popular via radio broadcasts.

After performing at a gig for the dance couple Duque and Gabi at the Assírio cabaret, they were discovered by the wealthy Arnaldo Guinle who sponsored their first European tour in 1921. In Paris they served as ambassadors of Brazilian music, performing for six months at the Schéhérazade cabaret. Their tour was a complete success and Pixinguinha received much praise from many distinguished Parisian musical artists including the Harold de Bozzi. Upon returning to Brazil, they toured to Buenos Aires where they made recordings for RCA Victor. It is in these recordings that the mature sound of Os Oito Batutas can be heard.

Pixinguinha returned from Paris with a broadened musical perspective. He began to incorporate jazz standards and ragtime into his group's repertoire, changing the lineup dramatically by adding saxophones, trumpets, trombone, piano, and a drum kit. The name was changed to simply  to reflect the new sound. He had also purchased a saxophone for his personal use which he began to experiment with.

Orquestra Victor Brasileira

In the late 1920s, Pixinguinha was hired by RCA Victor to lead the Orquestra Victor Brasileira, and during his tenure there he refined his skills as an arranger. It was common for choro musicians at the time to improvise their parts based on a simple piano score, but the growing demand for radio music from large ensembles required fully realized written scores for every instrument, and Pixinguinha was one of the few composers with this skill. It was in this role that he created some of his most famous compositions, which were popularized by well-known singers of the age such as Francisco Alves and Mário Reis.

Lacerda's conjunto regional
In 1939 he was succeeded by well-known composer Radamés Gnattali, and Pixinguinha left Victor to join flautist Benedito Lacerda's band, where he took up the tenor saxophone as his primary instrument and continued to compose music for the group.

Lacerda's band was a conjunto regional (or just regional), the name given to in-house bands hired by radio stations to perform music and accompany singers, often live in front of a studio audience. Throughout the 30s, 40s  regionais provided steady employment to the very best choro musicians of the day and led to the professionalization of the Brazilian music industry. It was with Lacerda that Pixinguinha began another fertile period of composing and recording. Due to economic troubles as the regionais fell out of favor in the late 40s, Pixinguinha had to sell the rights to his compositions to Benedito Lacerda, who for this appears a co-composer of many of Pixinguinha's tunes, even those composed while Lacerda was a boy. In the recordings with Lacerda, Pixinguinha plays secondary parts on the saxophone while Lacerda plays the flute part on tunes that Pixinguinha originally wrote on that instrument.

Retirement and death
By the mid 1950s, changing tastes and the emerging popularity of samba and American jazz in Brazil led to the decline of the choro regional as other genres became dominant on the radio. Pixinguinha spent his time in retirement, appearing in public only on rare occasions (such as the "Evening of Choro" TV programs produced by Jacob do Bandolim in 1955 and 1956).

Pixinguinha died in 1973 in the Church of Nossa Senhora da Paz in Ipanema while attending a baptism. He was buried in the Cemitério de Inhaúma. The day, which was believed to be his birthday, April 23, is today commemorated as the National Day of Choro in Brazil. The day was officially established in 2000 after a campaign by bandolim player Hamilton de Holanda and his students at the Raphael Rabello School of Choro. In November 2016, however, it was discovered that Pixinguinha's real birth date was May 4, and not April 23. Despite that, Brazil's National Day of Choro remained unaltered.

Pixinguinha is depicted in the 2021 biographical film Pixinguinha, Um Homem Carinhoso. He was portrayed by Brazilian actor Seu Jorge.

Musical contributions 
Compared to the older chorões of the late 19th century from which he drew inspiration, Pixinguinha's compositions were more sophisticated in their use of harmony, rhythm and counterpoint. Whereas many of the older compositions were intended to be played on piano, Pixinguinha's works took full advantage of the larger musical groups (regionais) with which he worked, incorporating intricate melodic lines, brassy fanfares, contrapuntal bass lines, and highly syncopated rhythms. Pixinguinha was one of the first band leaders to regularly include Afro-Brazilian percussion instruments, such as the pandeiro and afoxé, that have now become standard in choro and samba music.

His arrangements were probably influenced by the sound of ragtime and American jazz bands that became popular early in his career. When he released "Carinhoso" in 1930 and "Lamentos" in 1928, Pixinguinha was criticized for incorporating too much of a jazz sound into his work. Today these famous compositions have become a respected part of the choro canon.

Pixinguinha's compositions

A pombinha (com Donga)
A vida é um buraco
Aberlado
Abraçando Jacaré
Acerta o passo
Aguenta, seu Fulgêncio (com Lourenço Lamartine)
Ai, eu queria (com Vidraça)
Ainda existe
Ainda me recordo
Amigo de povo
Assim é que é
Benguelê
Bianca (com Andreoni)
Buquê de flores (com W. Falcão)
Cafezal em flor (com Eugênio Fonseca)
Carinhos
Carinhoso (com João de Barro)
Carnavá tá aí (com Josué de Barros)
Casado na orgia (com João da Baiana)
Casamento do coronel Cristino
Céu do Brasil (com Gomes Filho)
Chorei
Chorinho no parque São Jorge (com Salgado Filho)
Cochichando (com João de Barro e Alberto Ribeiro)
Conversa de crioulo (com Donga e João de Baiana)
Dança dos ursos
Dando topada
Desprezado
Displicente
Dominante
Dominó
Encantadora
Estou voltando
Eu sou gozado assim
Fala baixinho (com Hermínio Bello de Carvalho)
Festa de branco (com Baiano)
Foi muamba (com Índio)
Fonte abandonada (com Índio)
Fraternidade
Gargalhada
Gavião calçudo (com Cícero de Almeida)
Glória
Guiomar (com Baiano)
Há! hu! lá! ho! (com Donga e João da Baiana)
Harmonia das flores (com Hermínio Bello de Carvalho)
Hino a Ramos
Infantil
Iolanda
Isso é que é viver (com Hermínio Bello de Carvalho)
Isto não se faz (com Hermínio Bello de Carvalho)
Já andei (com Donga e João da Baiana)
Já te digo (com China)
Jardim de Ilara (com C. M. Costal)
Knock-out
Lamento
Lamentos (com Vinícius de Moraes)
Lá-ré
Leonor
Levante, meu nego
Lusitânia (com F. G. D. )
Mais quinze dias
Mama, meu netinho (com Jararaca)
Mamãe Isabé (com João da Baiana)
Marreco quer água
Meu coração não te quer (com E. Almeida)
Mi tristezas solo iloro
Mulata baiana (com Gastão Vianna)
Mulher boêmia
Mundo melhor (com Vinícius de Moraes)
Não gostei dos teus olhos (com João da Baiana)
Não posso mais
Naquele tempo (com Benedito Lacerda e Reginaldo Bessa)
Nasci pra domador (com Valfrido Silva)
No elevador
Noite e dia (com W. Falcão)
Nostalgia ao luar
Número um
O meu conselho
Os batutas (com Duque)
Os cinco companheiros
Os home implica comigo (com Carmen Miranda)
Onde foi Isabé
Oscarina
Paciente
Página de dor (com Índio)
Papagaio sabido (com C. Araújo)
Patrão, prenda seu gado (com Donga e João da Baiana)
Pé de mulata
Poema de raça (com Z. Reis e Benedito Lacerda)
Poética
Por você fiz o que pude (com Beltrão)
Pretensiosa
Promessa
Que perigo
Que querê (com Donga e João da Baiana)
Quem foi que disse
Raiado (com Gastão Vianna)
Rancho abandonado (com Índio)
Recordando
Rosa (com Otávio de Sousa)
Rosa
Samba de fato (com Baiano)
Samba de nego
Samba do urubu
Samba fúnebre (com Vinícius de Moraes)
Samba na areia
Sapequinha
Saudade do cavaquinho (com Muraro)
Seresteiro
Sofres porque queres
Solidão
Sonho da Índia (com N. N. e Duque)
Stella (com de Castro e Sousa)
Teu aniversário
Teus ciúmes
Triangular
Tristezas não pagam dívidas
Um a zero (com Benedito Lacerda)
Um caso perdido
Uma festa de Nanã (com Gastão Vianna) * Urubu
Vamos brincar
Variações sobre o urubu e o gavião
Vem cá! não vou!
Vi o pombo gemê (com Donga e João da Baiana)
Você é bamba (com Baiano)
Você não deve beber (com Manuel Ribeiro)
Vou pra casa
Xou Kuringa (com Donga e João da Baiana)
Yaô africano (com Gastão Vianna)
Zé Barbino (com Jararaca)
Proezas de Solon
Vou Vivendo

See also
 Afro-Brazilians
 choro

References

Bibliography
 Choro: a social history of a Brazilian popular music. Tamara Elena Livingston-Isenhour and Thomas George Caracas Garcia. Indiana University Press, 2005, pp. 91–98.

External links
 Official website
 
Pandora Project's biography of Pixinguinha (in English)
A Short Biography (in Portuguese)
 (Video)
IMS reveals documents about Pixinguinha with new choros and new birth date. O Globo 2016-11-29 (in Portuguese)

Brazilian composers
Afro-Brazilian people
Choro musicians
1897 births
1973 deaths
Brazilian saxophonists
Male saxophonists
20th-century composers
20th-century saxophonists
20th-century male musicians